This page lists the armoury (emblazons=graphics and blazons=heraldic descriptions; or coats of arms) of the communes from Q-Z in Oise (department 60)

Other pages:

 Armorial of the Communes of Oise (A–C)
 Armorial of the Communes of Oise (D–H)
 Armorial of the Communes of Oise (I–P)
 Armorial of the Communes of Oise (Q–Z)

Q
There are currently no Communes in Oise with coat of arms that starts with Q: Quesmy, Le Quesnel-Aubry, Quincampoix-Fleuzy, Quinquempoix

R

S

T

V

W

References 

Oise
Oise